Kamil Droszyński (born 28 January 1997) is a Polish volleyball player. At the professional club level, he plays for Trefl Gdańsk.

Career

National team
On April 12, 2015 Poland men's national under-19 volleyball team, including Droszyński, won title of U19 European Champion 2015. They beat Italy U19 in the final (3–1). He was named the Best Setter of the tournament. He took part in European Youth Olympic Festival with Polish national U19 team. On August 1, 2015 he achieved gold medal (final match with Bulgaria 3–0). On August 23, 2015 Poland achieved first title of U19 World Champion. In the final his team beat hosts – Argentina (3–2).

Honours

Clubs
 National championships
 2017/2018  Polish SuperCup, with PGE Skra Bełchatów

Youth national team
 2014  CEV U20 European Championship
 2015  CEV U19 European Championship
 2015  European Youth Olympic Festival
 2015  FIVB U19 World Championship

Individual awards
 2015: CEV U19 European Championship – Best Setter
 2015: FIVB U19 World Championship – Best Setter

References

External links
 
 Player profile at PlusLiga.pl 
 Player profile at Volleybox.net

1997 births
Living people
People from Ciechocinek
Sportspeople from Kuyavian-Pomeranian Voivodeship
Polish men's volleyball players
Polish expatriate sportspeople in Belgium
Expatriate volleyball players in Belgium
Polish expatriate sportspeople in Germany
Expatriate volleyball players in Germany
BKS Visła Bydgoszcz players
Czarni Radom players
Skra Bełchatów players
AZS Olsztyn players
Trefl Gdańsk players
Setters (volleyball)